Kamenev Bight is a shallow embayment about  wide in the ice shelf fringing the coast of Queen Maud Land, Antarctica. The bight was photographed from the air by the Sixth Norwegian Antarctic Expedition in 1958–59 and was mapped from these photos. It was also mapped in 1961 by the Soviet Antarctic Expedition who named it for S.S. Kamenev, an organizer of Arctic expeditions.

See also
Golubaya Bay

References

Bays of Queen Maud Land
Princess Astrid Coast
Bights (geography)